Neeraj Udhwani is an Indian screenwriter and film director.

Career 
In 2006, Udhwani started his career as a writer for The Great Indian Comedy Show for Star Plus. In 2011, he wrote his first film Dil Toh Baccha Hai Ji and later in 2013, he wrote the screenplay and story of Mere Dad Ki Maruti. His work in television involves Webbed for Mtv, Yeh hai Aashiqui for BBC, and Gumrah for Channel V. He also wrote Inside Edge for Prime Video and Home for ALT Balaji in digital platforms.

Udhwani directed Maska as his debut film, which released on Netflix on 27 March 2020. He also directed the web series TVF Tripling.

Personal life 
Udhwani resides in Mumbai. He is married to scriptwriter Ishita Moitra.

References

External links 

 

Indian film directors
Indian screenwriters
Living people
Year of birth missing (living people)